Patience Island lies off the northwest coast of Prudence Island in the town of Portsmouth, Rhode Island. Aside from a single 600-square foot house, which is disconnected from the state electrical grid, Patience Island is otherwise uninhabited.

History
The island and others nearby were named by Roger Williams and other early colonists.  Colonial school children often recited the poem: "Patience, Prudence, Hope, and Despair. And the little Hog over there." Patience Island was a gift from the Narragansett Indians to Roger Williams and Arthur Steere, First  Senator of Rhode Island. Arthur never lived on the Island but his descendents Earle and Clark Steere of The Warwick Cove Marina was the last to live in the farm house on the Island. Now the Island is densely overgrown with vines and brush. 

The island is populated by a warren of New England cottontail rabbits, which is part of a species restoration program related to the animal's candidacy for listing under the Endangered Species Act of 1973. In 2021, one rabbit on the island tested positive for tularemia.

References

Patience Island: Block 4000, Block Group 4, Census Tract 401.03, Newport County, Rhode Island United States Census Bureau
Frederic Denlson, Narragansett Sea and Shore, (J.A. & R.A. Reid, Providence, RI., 1879)
George L. Seavey, Rhode Island's Coastal Natural Areas.

Islands of Newport County, Rhode Island
Portsmouth, Rhode Island
Islands of Narragansett Bay
Islands of Rhode Island